The mountain toad (Incilius cavifrons) is a species of toad in the family Bufonidae. It is endemic to the Sierra de los Tuxtlas region in southern Veracruz state, Mexico.

Its natural habitats are tropical pine-oak forests. It breeds in streams.

This naturally rare species is threatened by habitat loss caused by agricultural activities, wood extraction, and infrastructure development.

References

cavifrons
Amphibians described in 1950
Endemic amphibians of Mexico
Endemic fauna of Los Tuxtlas
Taxonomy articles created by Polbot